Les Vierges du Québec is the twelfth studio album by Canadian Singer/Songwriter Jean-Pierre Ferland, released in 1974, and is part of a trilogy started in 1970 with his album Jaune and followed by Soleil in 1971.

Track list 
All tracks by Jean-Pierre Ferland & Jean-Pierre Lauzon

 "Qu'est-ce que ça peut ben faire" – 4:20
 "Women's Lib (1919)" – 3:41
 "Les Vierges du Québec" – 6:25
 "Simone" – 4:09
 "Sniff... Sniff..." – 0:50
 "Isabelle" – 2:37
 "Le Motel Alfred" – 5:17
 "T'es mon amour, t'es ma maîtresse" – 2:23
 "Bonsoir madame" – 2:15

Personnel

Band
Jean-Pierre Ferland – Arranger, Vocals, Lyricist, Producer
Tomi Lee Bradley – Arranger, Backing Vocals, Voices
Luis Cabaza – Synthesizer, Piano, Arranger
J.P. Lauzon – Organ, Guitar, Arranger, Double Bass
Richard Provençal – Percussion, Arranger, Drums, Triangle
Bob Segarini – Backing vocals
 Randy Bishop - Backing vocals

Production

Nick Blagona – Engineer, Mixing
Claude Demers – Engineer

Jean-Pierre Ferland albums
1974 albums
French-language albums